Kick Start is a British motorcycle trials game show that aired on BBC1 from 6 August 1979 to 17 August 1992. It was originally hosted by Dave Lee Travis from 1979 to 1980 and then it was hosted by Peter Purves from 1981 to 1992.

Format
Trials were run against the clock. Riders on off-road motorcycles were required to run over obstacles such as logs, oil drums, rockeries, water troughs, walls, steep banking, cliff-faces and often a VW Beetle. Time penalties were incurred for putting a foot on the ground while tackling an obstacle or touching or knocking over specified parts of an obstacle (such as the "bunny hop").

Transmissions

Original

Junior

Other media
A video-game inspired by the series called Kikstart was released for the Commodore 64 in 1985 by Mastertronic. It was also released for the Commodore 16 / Commodore Plus/4 and Atari 8-bit computers. According to the game's programmer, Shaun Southern, "The C64 version's name at least, was a shameless rip-off of the TV series."

References

External links

1979 British television series debuts
1992 British television series endings
1970s British television series
1980s British sports television series
1990s British sports television series
BBC Television shows
English-language television shows